Whitehead Island is an island in St. George, Knox County, Maine. Whitehead Light was built on the island in 1807. It is one of the foggiest places on the Maine coast, averaging 80 days of fog a year. Whitehead Lifesaving Station, a property on the National Register of Historic Places is also located on the island.

See also
 List of islands of Maine

References

Islands of Knox County, Maine
Islands of Maine
Coastal islands of Maine